ToddWorld is a Flash animated children's television series created by Todd Parr and Gerry Renert through their California-based company SupperTime Entertainment. The show was produced by Mike Young Productions, an animation studio based in California.

The series aired on TLC and Discovery Kids in the United States, in the United Kingdom on CBeebies, and in Australia on ABC Kids.

The series continued to air on TLC until 2007 and Discovery Kids until 2008, and now airs on Kabillion and Ultra Kidz.

Characters
 Todd (voiced by Ryan Hirakida) is a blue boy with five strands of hair. He likes to draw and eat macaroni and cheese in the bathtub. He is an energetic and bright young boy who enjoys creative hobbies and sports, and likes to read and make new things. His playful and kind personality leads him to easily make new friends, and his curiosity in getting to know others makes him fairly open-minded when it comes to what makes people different. He is very attached to his pet dog Benny, and often feels lonely if he is not around. There are times when Todd can be selfish if he really wants something, but he always learns right from wrong and makes up for it. At times he is also the voice of reason in the group, but is just as likely to act as zany as Pickle. His catchphrases include "Neato Mosquito", "Leaping Lima Beans", "Mighty Macaroni", "Awesome Possum", and "Hi, I'm Todd, and this is my world!"
 Benny (voiced by Doron Bell) is Todd's talking dog, who is energetic and playful with a big appetite. He can be lazy at times and sleeps in a lot, but also likes to hang out with the group. Benny values his bond with Todd, and Todd's opinion of him, above all else. While Benny acts cool outwardly, he, like the others, has his own concerns and worries.
 Pickle (voiced by Peter Kelamis) is one of Todd's best friends. He has green skin with a crown and purple polka-dotted pants. He has three pet worms called "the Worminis" named Rupert, Bernard and Francesca, who love to do acrobatic tricks. He lives in a circus tent with a menagerie of circus animals (a pink elephant named Edith, a pink monkey trapeze artist named Estelle, a dancing bear named Brian and a lion named Greg). Pickle wants to have fun,  and has many talents he learned from growing up in a circus. He is curious about new experiences and people, although he may be suspicious at first. He often worries about small things until he realizes that he should have just asked. His energetic and friendly personality allows him to easily bond with his friends and other people. He may not be the brightest of the group, but he is capable of helping out or coming up with zany ideas.
 Sophie (voiced by Chantal Strand) is another friend of Todd. She has two red pigtails that she can flap to fly. She is smart, creative and loves to invent things, but can become stubborn if her plans do not work. Nevertheless, she continues to search for new ideas. She cares for others, with an empathy that allows her to easily befriend anyone. Sophie loves to have fun and tries not to instantly judge others. She lives in an apartment building with her cat Mitzi, her pet goldfish Banana, and three adopted puppies named Oswald, Jake and Inky.
Stella (voiced by Maggie Blue O'Hara in season 1, and by Britt McKillip in season 2) is a fashionable and attention-seeking young girl who is obsessed with glitter, sparkles, stars and hair accessories. She is a caring, empathetic friend who will do what she can to make a person feel better. She is mature and creative, but is not above begging or manipulating someone with tears to get what she wants.

Episodes

Season 1

Season 2

References

2000s American animated television series
2004 American television series debuts
2008 American television series endings
2000s Canadian animated television series
2004 Canadian television series debuts
2008 Canadian television series endings
American children's animated television series
American television shows based on children's books
American flash animated television series
American preschool education television series
Animated preschool education television series
Animated television series about children
Animated television series about dogs
Canadian children's animated television series
Canadian television shows based on children's books
Canadian flash animated television series
Canadian preschool education television series
2000s preschool education television series
TLC (TV network) original programming
Discovery Kids original programming
Television series by Mattel Creations
Television series by Splash Entertainment
Qubo
CBeebies